Ardrossan is a hamlet in Alberta, Canada, within Strathcona County.

The community takes its name from Ardrossan, in Scotland.

Ardrossan is located directly to the east of Sherwood Park, and is just south of the Yellowhead Highway on Range Road 222. It can also be accessed by Township Road 530 coming out of Sherwood Park.

Ardrossan has a large recreation complex.

Demographics 
The population of Ardrossan according to the 2022 municipal census conducted by Strathcona County is 919, an increase from its 2018 municipal census population count of 532.

Education 
There are three schools in the hamlet. Ardrossan Elementary School, and Ardrossan Junior Senior High School, both operated by Elk Island Public Schools, and Holy Redeemer Catholic School, operated by Elk Island Catholic Schools.  The junior/senior high school also houses the Ardrossan Community Theatre and the sports fields surrounding the schools were recently redeveloped with new baseball diamonds, soccer fields, football fields and a tennis court.

See also 
List of communities in Alberta
List of hamlets in Alberta

References 

Designated places in Alberta
Hamlets in Alberta
Strathcona County